Gerald Fell (3 December 1898–1977) was an English footballer who played in the Football League for Barnsley, Bradford Park Avenue and Chesterfield.

References

1898 births
1979 deaths
English footballers
Association football forwards
English Football League players
Barnsley F.C. players
Bradford (Park Avenue) A.F.C. players
Chesterfield F.C. players
Gainsborough Trinity F.C. players
Mexborough Athletic F.C. players
Newark Town F.C. players